The Bass Highway is an 87 kilometre highway in Victoria, Australia, branching off the South Gippsland Highway at the township of Lang Lang and running south, along the eastern shore of Western Port, to Anderson (and the turn-off to Phillip Island). The Bass Highway continues easterly to Kilcunda, Wonthaggi and Inverloch, then turns north-easterly to rejoin the South Gippsland Highway at Leongatha. It was named due to its proximity to the Bass Strait.

History
The passing of the Highways and Vehicles Act of 1924 through the Parliament of Victoria provided for the declaration of State Highways, roads two-thirds financed by the State government through the Country Roads Board (later VicRoads). The Bass Highway was declared a State Highway in the 1947/48 financial year, from the South Gippsland Highway near Nyora via Anderson, and Dalyston to Wonthaggi (for a total of 30 miles); before this declaration, the roads were referred to as (Main) Coast Road, Anderson-Dalyston Road and Dalyston-Wonthaggi Road. In the 1959/60 financial year, another section from Wonthaggi to Inverloch was added, along the former Inverloch-Wonthaggi Road. With the passing of the Transport Act of 1983 (itself an evolution from the original Highways and Vehicles Act of 1924), it was extended east along the former Inverloch-Leongatha Road to Leongatha in December 1990.

The Bass Highway was signed as State Route 181 between Lang Lang and Wonthaggi in 1986, later extended with the road to Leongatha in 1990. With Victoria's conversion to the newer alphanumeric system in the late 1990s, this was replaced by route M420 between Lang Lang and Grantville, A420 between Grantville and the Phillip Island turn-off at Anderson, and B460 between Anderson and Leongatha. A duplication project improving the quality of the road upgraded the A420 allocation to M420 in 2013, now running the entire way between Lang Lang and a new link road to Phillip Island in south-western Bass.

The passing of the Road Management Act 2004 granted the responsibility of overall management and development of Victoria's major arterial roads to VicRoads: in 2004, VicRoads re-declared the road as Bass Highway (Arterial #6710) between South Gippsland Highway in Lang Lang and Leongatha.

Duplication towards Phillip Island
A project to duplicate the Bass Highway from Lang Lang to Anderson (east of Phillip Island) commenced in the late 1990s, addressing the high traffic demand of the route and recent crash history. It was constructed in seven stages, with Stage 7 of the project from Woolmer Road to Phillip Island Road completed in 2013.

The benefits of this project include:

reduced travel times to Phillip Island which hosts some of Victoria's favourite tourist and sporting attractions 
eliminating the roundabout at Anderson, and providing a direct route between Melbourne and Phillip Island 
bypassing a winding section of Phillip Island Road and providing two added lanes along Bass Highway. This will help address the crash history in this area. There have been 13 crashes in a recent five-year period. 
an overpass, which will be constructed near Netherwood will provide smoother and safer movements at the connection of the Bass Highway and the new link road, for Phillip Island and Wonthaggi-bound traffic 
helping traffic to exit Phillip Island after major events such as the MotoGP

The project was completed in 2013.

Major intersections

References

See also

 Highways in Australia
 Highways in Victoria

Highways in Victoria (Australia)